The Zurich Classic of New Orleans is a professional golf tournament in Louisiana on the PGA Tour, currently held at TPC Louisiana in Avondale, a suburb southwest of New Orleans. Beginning  in 1938 and held annually since 1958, it is commonly played in early to mid-spring. Zurich Insurance Group is the main sponsor, and it is organized by the Fore!Kids Foundation.

The winning team in 2022 split over $2.39 million.

In 2017, the Zurich Classic became a team event, with eighty pairs. One member of each team is initially chosen via the Tour priority rankings, and his partner must either be a PGA Tour member or earn entry through a sponsor exemption. The stroke play format was alternate shot (foursome) in the first and third rounds and better ball (fourball) for the second and fourth rounds. The cut line is 33 teams, plus ties. The winners earn 400 FedEx Cup points and two-year exemptions, but will not receive Masters invitations and no world ranking points are awarded for the event.

In 2018, the format switched to fourball for the first and third rounds and alternate shot for the second and fourth rounds.

Tournament names and corporate sponsors
 Crescent City Open (1938)
 New Orleans Open (1939–1948)
 Greater New Orleans Open Invitational (1958–1971)
 Greater New Orleans Invitational (1972–1974)
 First NBC New Orleans Open (1975–1979)
 Greater New Orleans Open (1980)
 USF&G New Orleans Open (1981)
 USF&G Classic (1982–1991)
 Freeport-McMoRan Golf Classic (1992–1993)
 Freeport-McMoRan Classic (1994–1995)
 Freeport-McDermott Classic (1996–1998)
 Compaq Classic of New Orleans (1999–2002)
 HP Classic of New Orleans (2003–2004)
 Zurich Classic of New Orleans (2005–present)

Tournament highlights
 1966: Frank Beard wins his first New Orleans title by two shots over Gardner Dickinson. The win by Beard came two years after his being diagnosed with and almost dying of encephalitis shortly after playing in the 1964 Greater New Orleans Open Invitational.
 1972: PGA Tour rookie Rogelio Gonzales was disqualified after it was learned he had changed his scorecard earlier in the tournament. In addition to his disqualification, the PGA Tour lifted Gonzales playing privileges.
 1975: Billy Casper wins for the 51st and ultimately last time on the PGA Tour. He beats Peter Oosterhuis by two shots.
 1978: Lon Hinkle earns his first ever PGA Tour title by birdieing the 72nd hole to beat Fuzzy Zoeller and Gibby Gilbert by one shot. The win by Hinkle ends Gary Player's consecutive tournament winning streak at three.
 1984: Mac O'Grady gets into an altercation with a female tournament volunteer. He is later fined and suspended by Tour Commissioner Deane Beman for conduct unbecoming a professional golfer.
 1990: David Frost beats Greg Norman by one shot after holing out from a sand trap on the 72nd hole.
 1995: In need of a win to qualify for The Masters, Davis Love III defeats Mike Heinen in a sudden death playoff.
 1999: Carlos Franco becomes the first South American to win on the PGA Tour since Roberto De Vicenzo at the 1968 Houston Champions International. Franco wins by two shots over Steve Flesch and Harrison Frazar.
 2002: K. J. Choi becomes the first Korean born golfer to win on the PGA Tour. He beats Dudley Hart and Geoff Ogilvy by four shots.
 2004: Vijay Singh shoots a final round 63 to beat Phil Mickelson and Joe Ogilvie by one shot.
 2017: The event switched to a team format.

Courses
From the event's inception through 2004, it was played at a series of courses in New Orleans, starting at the City Park Golf Courses, where it was played through 1962. From 1963 through 1988, the event had a lengthy relationship with Lakewood Country Club before shifting to English Turn Golf and Country Club in 1989 for sixteen editions through 2004.

TPC Louisiana in Avondale became the host in 2005, but damage to the course by Hurricane Katrina that August forced the event back to English Turn for a year in 2006. It returned to the TPC in 2007, its current home.

Course layout
TPC Louisiana in 2016

Source:

Winners

Note: Green highlight indicates scoring records
Sources:

Multiple winners
There is yet to be a three-time winner at New Orleans, but eleven have won twice. Four won in consecutive years: Byron Nelson, Bo Wininger, Tom Watson, and Franco.

2 wins

Henry Picard: 1939, 1941
Byron Nelson: 1945, 1946
Bo Wininger: 1962, 1963
Frank Beard: 1966, 1971
Billy Casper: 1958, 1975
Tom Watson: 1980, 1981
Chip Beck: 1988, 1992
Ben Crenshaw: 1987, 1994
Carlos Franco: 1999, 2000
Billy Horschel: 2013, 2018
Cameron Smith: 2017, 2021

See also
Southern (Spring) Open, a 1922 PGA Tour event in New Orleans
Sports in New Orleans

Notes

References

External links

Coverage on PGA Tour's official site
TPC Louisiana – official site
English Turn Golf & Country Club – former host (1989–2004, 2006)
Lakewood Golf Club – former host (1963–1988)
City Park Golf Courses – former host (1937–1962)

PGA Tour events
Golf in New Orleans
Golf
Recurring sporting events established in 1938
1938 establishments in Louisiana